This is a list of the Austrian Singles Chart number-one hits of 1993.

See also
1993 in music

References

1993 in Austria
1993 record charts
Lists of number-one songs in Austria